BISL or BiSL may refer to:
 The British Ice Hockey Superleague (BISL), a professional ice hockey league in the United Kingdom between 1996 and 2003
 Business Information Services Library (BiSL), a framework used for functional management and information management
 Business in Sport and Leisure (BISL), a British umbrella organization of a number of major sport and leisure companies
 British International School of Ljubljana (BISL), a school located in Ljubljana, Slovenia